Wilbur John Moore (April 22, 1916 – August 9, 1965) was an American football running back in the National Football League (NFL) for the Washington Redskins.  He played college football at the University of Minnesota and was drafted in the ninth round of the 1939 NFL Draft.  On August 9, 1965, Moore was shot to death in front of his wife's home in Mitchellville, Maryland.  He and Clara Moore had been separated for three months, and had been seen arguing before she killed him with a single shot from a .22 caliber revolver.

References

External links

1916 births
1965 deaths
People from Austin, Minnesota
American football running backs
United States Marine Corps personnel of World War II
Minnesota Golden Gophers football players
University of Minnesota alumni
Washington Redskins players
Players of American football from Minnesota
United States Marines
Deaths by firearm in Maryland
People murdered in Maryland
Male murder victims
Mariticides